Syntomostola xanthosoma is a moth in the family Erebidae. It was described by Paul Dognin in 1912. It is found in Colombia.

References

Natural History Museum Lepidoptera generic names catalog

Moths described in 1912
Phaegopterina